Nadav Na'aman (born in 1939 in Jerusalem) is an Israeli archaeologist and historian. He specializes in the study of Near East in the second and first millenniums BC. His research combines the history of the Ancient Near East, archaeology, Assyrology, and the study of the Bible. He possesses broad knowledge in all these four branches of research.

Biography 
Na'aman was born on a kibbutz near Jerusalem and grew up on the Kinneret kibbutz on the Sea of Galilee. His father was Professor Shlomo Naaman, who taught in the Department of General History of Tel Aviv University.

After completing his IDF military service (1957-1960), he left the kibbutz in 1964 and studied archaeology and Jewish history. He received his doctorate in 1975 from Tel Aviv University with Yohanan Aharoni with a thesis on the importance of the Amarna letters for the history of Israel. A time as a lecturer in archaeology and history of the ancient Near East at Tel Aviv University followed.

In 1984 Na'aman became Associate Professor of Jewish History. From 1989 until his retirement in 2007 he held a chair in Jewish history at Tel Aviv University. In 2012 he was elected a member of the Israel Academy of Sciences.

His younger sister is Michal Na'aman, a noted Israeli artist.

Academic career

Azekah Inscription 

In 1974, Na'aman published his first article, which contained a discovery of considerable importance for research. He found that two clay tablets written in cuneiform in the Akkadian language, one of which was attributed to Tiglath Pileser III, King of Assyria and the other to Sargon II, belong to one tablet that was broken. This became known as the Azekah Inscription.

Earlier, in one of these two pieces, researchers read the name of Azariah, King of Judah, and therefore assumed that he took part in the war that was going on in central Syria. The fragment of the second tablet mentions the attack on the city of Azekah, which was attributed to Sargon, king of Assyria.

When the two fragments of the tablets were put together, it became clear that they describe, in considerable detail, the Assyrian King Sennacherib's campaign against Hezekiah, king of Judah. As a result, what was written earlier about Tiglath-Pileser and Sargon's campaigns to the Land of Israel was omitted from scholarship, and in contrast, important details were added about Sennacherib's campaigns to Judah in 701 BCE.

Provenance of el-Amarna documents 
Na'aman teamed up with archaeologists Israel Finkelstein and Yuval Goren to try to determine the origin of the Amarna tablets. They conducted the examination of the composition and origin of clay of which the tablets were made.

Yuval Goren removed samples from hundreds of tablets, tested and determined what material they were made of and from where in Canaan could a material with such a chemical and mineralogical composition come. Thus, in combination with the historical data emerging from the tablets and the archaeological data from the sites throughout Canaan, the researchers determined the provenance of these tablets. 

The three authored the book Inscribed in Clay, in which they presented the data from their research, including conclusions about the origin of the tablets and what this implies for the study of Amarna documents. In this way they could determine the origin of many tablets in which the sender's name was lost, or was not remembered at all, or the tablet was broken, and only a little of it survived.

And there are cases where the names of places are mentioned, but researchers disagreed on the question of its identification, thus a petrographic examination of the clay made it possible to decide the debate.

Other contributions 
Na'aman also took part in the Brook of Egypt debate, identifying this biblical river as the Besor Stream.

The identification of the site of Khirbet Qeiyafa proved to be problematic. Na'aman also contributed significantly to this debate. He held that the ruins were Canaanite, based on strong similarities with the nearby Canaanite excavations at Beit Shemesh.

The tribute volume upon his retirement was published in 2006.

Notes

Publications (Selection) 
 Ancient Israel and Its Neighbors: Interaction and Counteraction. Collected Essays, Vol. 1. Winona Lake 2005.
 Canaan in the Second Millennium B.C.E. Collected Essays, Vol. 2. Winona Lake 2005.
 Ancient Israel’s History and Historiography: The First Temple Period. Collected Essays, Vol. 3. Winona Lake 2006.

External Links 
 Tel Aviv University: Prof. Nadav Na'Aman (Curriculum Vitae)
 Listing at Israel Academy of Sciences and Humanities

Israeli archaeologists
Academic staff of Tel Aviv University
20th-century archaeologists
Biblical archaeologists